Marisol was a Brazilian primetime TV Series that aired on SBT starring Bárbara Paz, Carla Fiorini,  Adriana Ferreyr, Carlos Casagrande, and Glauce Graieb. Based on the original Mexican by Inés Rodena.

The TV series is a remake on the Mexican series of the same name, and was adapted for the Portuguese by Henry Zambelli, with supervision text Ecila Pedroso and direction Antonino Seabra, Jacques Lagôa, Henrique Martins, and David Grimberg.

The series debuted on April 9, 2002, and aired every nights at 8:30 pm BRT.

'Marisol' rerun from January 1, 2007 to March 23, 2007, in 60 chapters, succeeding Wounds of Love. Was replayed for the 2nd time in SBT of March 5 to August 20 of 2012, in 119 chapters, replacing the rerun of Glamour, by turn was replaced by Canavial of Passion.

Overview 
Marisol is a simple girl, burdened by life, but a strong character without losing the goodness and sweetness. She lives with her mother, Sophie, who is ill, in a tenement and sells paper flowers in the streets, which prepares herself to survive. Marisol has a trauma that leaves her anxious: a large scar on her face because she had an accident while playing in a park. As she and her mother are poor, Marisol could never do the necessary operation to get rid of the scar.
She is the granddaughter of a powerful businessman, owner of a large mining company, Dr. Augusto Lima Valley. When she was young, Sophia fell in love with Roger, that being poor was immediately rejected by Dr. Augustus, father of Sofia. Sofia and prejudice faced the family and fled with Roger. Once Marisol was born, Roger abandoned the two. Proudly, Sofia decided not to look for his family. The marriage of Sofia and Mario was engineered by Amparo, daughter of Dr. Augustus. Amparo gave a good sum of money for him to Roger seduce Sofia, to take away from home and the old testament tycoon.
On the verge of death, Sofia lives regret never having to Marisol allowed a decent life. Suffers because the daughter carries the trauma of scarring. Sofia decides to tell his true rise to Marisol, who does not believe in the mother. She hands the family ring Marisol, but when you're about to reveal the name of his grandfather, Sofia dies. The ring is the key to the true origin of Marisol is discovered.
Meanwhile, Marisol get to know the young millionaire Rodrigo Lima Valley and both end up getting involved. Rodrigo is the result of the marriage of Leonardo voluble, the other son of Augustus and arrogant Amparo, a woman capable of anything to defend their interests.
Leonardo lives with Amparo a failed marriage and so seeks refuge in the arms of his mistress, the opportunistic Zulema. Zulema is also a lover of Mario, and when this figure along with the involvement of Marisol with Rodrigo, Rodrigo tries to seduce him to steal the arms of Marisol. To complete the misfortunes in life Marisol, the worst happens and Sofia dies. Helpless, Marisol becomes easy target for mischief of Mario and Zulema, however, in her way, she ends up crossing with Augustus and also happens to work at his mansion without knowing that he is her grandmother.
Amparo right away is the miserable life of Marisol and humiliate her whenever he can, and everything becomes complicated when Rodrigo assumes your dating her. Therefore, Amparo, Leonardo and Rosana digger, Rodrigo bride, the couple declare war.
The purpose of disrupting Marisol, Amparo approaches Marius, who becomes lover, to the chagrin of her other lover, Mariano, the dishonest family lawyer. Amparo and Mariano together has a big secret: Rodrigo is his son, not Leonardo. Amparo is investigating the life of Marisol and ends up discovering that she is the daughter of Sofia, and since Rodrigo is not the son of Leonardo, Marisol is therefore the sole heir of the fortune of the Lima Valley. To preserve its discovery, Amparo Augusto poisons to prevent him from discovering the truth, which, however, Amparo did not imagine that august had 2 years left everything and Marisol as their main heir.

Cast

Main cast 
 Bárbara Paz as Marisol. - Endowed with a sweet beauty, dominated by tender and heartfelt emotions, Marisol exposes his feelings truthfully and without any embarrassment. Marisol is a simple girl, innocent, humble and shy, because of a scar that marked the left to age 6, when she suffered an accident. But she is a battler. Despite its sweet and fragile appearance, Marisol is a strong and determined woman, prepared to face the challenges that life offers, and they are not few.
 Carlos Casa Grande as Rodrigo Lima do Vale, Boys young, beautiful, educated, rich and engaging. It is heir to the great fortune of Dr. Augustus, his grandfather. Rodrigo was created in anticipation of taking over the family business, one of the largest mining companies in the country. But what Rodrigo wants actually is devote himself entirely to one of his great passions in life: painting. Contrary to what one might expect, Rodrigo has all the support from grandfather to follow your life the way you want. But his parents, Leonardo and Amparo do not think the same way.
 Glauce Graieb as Amparo Lima do Vale, Mother of Rodrigo, Amparo is a beautiful, seductive, but ambitious and selfish. It is the great villain of the story. Amparo has always been poor but succeeded in youth employment as a secretary Leonardo. At the time, dating Mariano, Rodrigo real father. When Leonardo was interested in her, Amparo did not hesitate to meet the expectations of his employer. Leonardo saw in the possibility of social mobility dreamed.
 Carla Fiorini as Mimi - Marisol's Friends. She's very funny and faithful. She loves Chico.
 Rodrigo Lombardi as Francisco Soares (Rodrigo Lombardi) - Francisco, known as Chico, younger brother of Mario and son of Margaret, has a big dream: to become a football goalkeeper, mainly fame and big money. It is an impossible dream because Chico is clumsy, like anything athletic. But be of good heart and good character.
 Adriana Ferreyr as Vanessa Lima do Vale, - Vanessa is the adopted daughter of Marisol. When Marisol has stolen his legitimate son, after much suffering, she encounters a girl abandoned in the street and decides to adopt her. Vanessa is raised with love, but she is a spoiled girl, vain and very strong personality. Vanessa does not know who was adopted and when he discovers, is furious and turns all her anger against Marisol. Influenced by Amparo, Vanessa tries to seduce Rodrigo, who now knows that he is not her father, to separate it from Marisol.
 Juan Alba as Dr. Rubens Linhares - Physician, beautiful, smart, rich, Rubens is a man of character. Friend, companion, loyal and honest, working in the clinic's father, Alvaro, also a doctor, in a country town. Rubens's friend Rodrigo. Rubens has two brothers, Camila and Dani, but he lost his mother. His father never remarried. He is a childhood friend of Rodrigo. Studied together when they were kids. Álvaro Rubens and Marisol are almost dead and succor.
 Roberto Arduim as Leonardo Lima Valley Son of Dr. Augusto de Amparo and her husband, Leonardo is a man of weak character and easily manipulated, especially by his wife. He lives in the shadow of his father. And despite being the president of the mining company, important decisions are still taken by Dr. Augusto. Leonardo has no autonomy, the thing that irritates and causes Amparo increasingly want the death of the father. Leonardo lived a loveless marriage.

Recurring cast

Development and production 

Marisol was the third TV Series produced by SBT and Televisa.

Reception 

In April 2012, SBT did the 3rd rerun of the show obtaining records in ratings.

Soundtrack

Awards 

Marisol was nominated for Best Drama at the 38th Contigos's Television Awards

Best Actor (Melhor Ator)
Carlos Casagrande

Best Actress (Melhor Atriz)
Bárbara Paz

Best Actress in Comedy (Melhor Atriz Cômica)
Carla Fioroni

Best Child Actress (Melhor Atriz Infantil)
Raíssa Medeiros

Best Costume Designer (Melhor Figurino)
Gilda Bandeira de Mello
Also for "A Pequena Travessa" (2002).

Best Director (Melhor Diretor)
Henrique Martins
Also for "A Pequena Travessa" (2002).

Best Drama (Melhor Novela)

Best Makeup (Melhor Maquiagem)
Alcir Mathias
Also for "A Pequena Travessa" (2002).

Best Production Design (Melhor Cenografia)
João Nascimento
Also for "A Pequena Travessa" (2002).

Best Romantic Couple (Melhor Par Romântico)
Carlos Casagrande
Bárbara Paz

Best Supporting Actor (Melhor Ator Coadjuvante)
Juan Alba

Best Supporting Actress (Melhor Atriz Coadjuvante)
Carla Fioroni

Best Villain - Female (Melhor Vilã)
Glauce Graieb

Best Villain - Male (Melhor Vilão)
Alexandre Frota
Most Promising Actor (Melhor Ator Revelação)

Jonathan Nogueira
Most Promising Actress (Melhor Atriz Revelação)
Francisca Queiroz

References

External links 
 Official page
 

Sistema Brasileiro de Televisão telenovelas
2002 telenovelas
Brazilian telenovelas
2002 Brazilian television series debuts
2002 Brazilian television series endings
Brazilian television series based on Mexican television series
Portuguese-language telenovelas